The 2005–06 Irish Cup was the 126th edition of Northern Ireland's premier football knock-out cup competition. It concluded on 6 May 2006 with the final.

Portadown were the defending champions, winning their 3rd Irish Cup last season after a 5–1 win over Larne in the 2005 final. This season Portadown reached the quarter-finals, but were defeated by Glentoran. Linfield went on to lift the cup for the 37th time, defeating archrivals Glentoran 2–1 in the final. This was the 15th and to date, last time that both clubs have met in the final.

Fifth round

|}

Replays

|}

Sixth round

|}

Replays

|}

Quarter-finals

|}

Semi-finals

|}

Final

References

2005-06
2005–06 domestic association football cups
Cup